Balocco is a comune (municipality) in the Province of Vercelli in the Italian region Piedmont, located about  northeast of Turin and about  northwest of Vercelli. It is the home of the Circuito di Balocco road-testing track.

Balocco borders the following municipalities: Buronzo, Carisio, Formigliana, San Giacomo Vercellese, and Villarboit.

Demographic evolution

Economy

The main activity is agriculture: rice farming, corn and wheat . The motorway nearby has favored the settlement of industrial companies.

Circuito di Balocco 
Balocco is the seat of the major proving ground of FCA Italy. The Circuito di Balocco test track was built in the early 1960s by Alfa Romeo for testing new cars, prototypes and racing cars. In the track is also hosted club and racing organization events.

References

External links 
The Balocco track

Cities and towns in Piedmont
Motorsport venues in Italy